Long Boi is an abnormally tall male duck that lives on Campus West of the University of York, England. He is an Indian Runner duck. He went viral and became an internet meme in 2021.

Origins 
Little is known about Long Boi's origins, although it is believed that he was left on the University of York campus as an unwanted pet. When first found, he appeared "very lonely and nervous" and struggled to fit in with the other ducks, who often bullied him. Students fed him to help him to settle into his new home.

Virality 
Long Boi became an internet sensation in 2021 following a Reddit post that incorrectly described him as the tallest mallard ever, at over 1 m tall (in fact he is around 70 cm tall). Long Boi was subsequently mentioned by James Corden on his US late-night talk show The Late Late Show in April 2021, who showed an edited image of Long Boi dressed in a trench coat and quipped, "Put a trench coat on that duck and he looks like two ducks trying to get into an R-rated movie". Followers of Long Boi's Instagram account, run by University of York biology student Zoe Duffin, increased to 16,300 people in less than 24 hours. Footballer Peter Crouch shared his appreciation of Long Boi, tweeting "That's my kind of duck!". In 2022 Long Boi was mentioned by Greg James on BBC Radio 1.

Long Boi has become a University of York campus celebrity and informal mascot, and has a student society dedicated to him. Long Boi fluffy toys have been presented to the university's graduates. He has been the subject of April Fools jokes by The Tab, claiming that the university planned to feature Long Boi on its new logo and that Vice-Chancellor Charlie Jeffery had awarded him an Honorary Doctorate, calling him the "perfect ambassador" for the university.

Personal life 
Long Boi spends most of his time on and around the lake near Derwent College, University of York. He appears to have become more confident and accepted by other ducks. His friends include a smaller male Indian runner duck called Chonky Boi, some female mallards, and a male mandarin duck called Fancy Boi.

References 

Individual animals in the United Kingdom
University of York
Internet memes introduced in 2021